Old Georgetown Cemetery, also known as San Gabriel Cemetery and Blue Hole Cemetery, is a cemetery in Georgetown, Texas, United States. The Georgetown Historical Survey Committee led efforts to restore the cemetery in 1968.

See also
 IOOF Cemetery (Georgetown, Texas)

References

External links
 

Cemeteries in Texas
Georgetown, Texas